Planta 4ª (English: The 4th Floor) is a 2003 Spanish film directed by Antonio Mercero and starring Juan José Ballesta,  Alejandro Zafra, Gorka Moreno, Luis Ángel Priego, and Monti Castiñeiras. It was nominated for Best Picture in the 2004 Goya Awards.

Plot
A group of seriously ill boys live on the fourth floor of a hospital. The floor is their home and the other patients their family. Miguel Ángel (Ballesta) is the leader of the group, recently arrived Jorge (Zafra) is fearfully awaiting his test results and Dani (Moreno) is experiencing his first love affair.

Cast
Juan José Ballesta as Miguel Ángel
Alejandro Zafra as Jorge
Gorka Moreno as Dani
Luis Ángel Priego
Monti Castiñeiras

Awards and nominations

Won
Montréal Film Festival 
Best Director (Antonio Mercero)

Nominated
Goya Awards
Best Film (lost to Take My Eyes)

Spanish Actors Union
Best Performance in a Minor Role – Male (Miguel Foronda)

See also 
 List of Spanish films of 2003

External links
 

2003 films
Spanish comedy films
2000s Spanish-language films
Medical-themed films
2003 comedy films
2000s Spanish films